Easten is a surname. Notable people with the surname include:

 Donald Easten (1918–2017), British Army officer of the Royal West Kents who was awarded the Military Cross

See also
 Easton (surname)